Stanley Beal (5 April 1924 – 2 April 2017) was an Australian rules footballer who played with Footscray in the Victorian Football League (VFL). 

Beal served as a gunner in the Australian Army during World War II, seeing active service in Papua New Guinea.

Notes

External links 

1924 births
2017 deaths
Australian rules footballers from Melbourne
Western Bulldogs players
People from Ringwood, Victoria
Australian Army personnel of World War II
Military personnel from Melbourne